A transverse abdominis plane block, also called TAP block, is a regional technique to provide analgesia after lower abdominal wall operations. The techniques was first introduced by Rafi in 2001. It is performed using local anesthetic agent mostly Ropivacaine, Bupivacaine but block does not last longer compared to when given with new drug Liposomal bupivacaine. There are multiple studies confirming liposomal bupivacaine TAP block is effective for up to 72 hours after the surgery. Citation???

The TAP block was the original fascial plane block for abdominal surgery.  However, there are many alternatives with comparable or better analgesic efficacy

References

Regional anesthesia